The Coffeelands Trust (Coffeelands Landmine Victims' Trust), is a project that provides direct support to victims of conflict who live and work in coffee communities throughout the world. The Trust seeks to connect the coffee industry and coffee consumers to victims of conflict and provides resources for rehabilitation services and economic development opportunities. It is a project of the non-profit organization Polus Center for Social & Economic Development based in Clinton, Massachusetts, United States.

Dean Cycon, owner of Deans Beans, a coffee-roasting company in Central Massachusetts and Michael Lundquist, Executive Director of the Polus Center for Social & Economic Development have worked for many years in developing countries to promote social and economic justice for some of the world's most vulnerable groups. Deans Beans and the Polus Center have partnered in the grassroots development projects that have created economic opportunity for "death train" victims in Tapachula, Mexico, assisted people with disabilities to create small businesses in Nicaragua, and worked together to address basic nutritional needs and helped to combat social stigma for people with leprosy in Ethiopia.

In 2005, Cycon's knowledge and experience with coffee farmers and their struggles and Lundquist's work with landmine victims allowed them to make the connection between landmines, unexploded ordnance, or UXO, and coffee. After review of the data they determined that landmines and UXO were present in six of the ten top coffee-producing countries in the world, and that these deadly devices not only kill and maim coffee farmers and their families, but have a significant negative impact on coffee production and the quality of coffee.

While the Ottawa Treaty focused the world's attention on the need to address the landmine issue; the majority of money and resources are directed toward mine removal and mine risk education; very little support is being allocated to direct victim assistance.

The United States and other donor nations have made substantial progress in the areas of landmine removal and mine risk education, but resources for direct victim assistance have been minimal and will likely continue to be. Because of the lack of resources for rehabilitation services many landmine survivors are facing a very uncertain future.

See also

References

External links
The Coffeelands Trust website

Coffee organizations
Mine action organizations
Non-profit organizations based in Massachusetts
Coffee in the United States
Agricultural organizations based in the United States
Agriculture in Massachusetts